Shaurya (IAST: shāurya, meaning 'Bravery') is a canister-launched hypersonic surface-to-surface tactical missile developed by the Indian Defence Research and Development Organisation (DRDO) for use by the Indian Armed Forces. It gives the potential to strike at very-long-range against any adversary.

Description 
The Shaurya missile is speculated to be the land version of the under-water Sagarika K-15 missile, although the DRDO officials have reportedly denied its connection with the K-15 programme.  Shaurya is stored in a composite canister, which makes it much easier to store for long periods without maintenance as well as to handle and transport. It also houses the gas generator to eject the missile from the canister before its solid propellant motors take over to hurl it at the intended target.

At DefExpo 2010 the missile was displayed without the container shroud, mounted on a land-mobile erector-launcher. Shaurya missiles can remain hidden or camouflaged in underground silos from enemy surveillance or satellites till they are fired from the special storage-cum-launch canisters. If put in silos, the DRDO scientists state that given Shaurya's limited range at present, either the silos will have to be constructed closer to India's borders or an extended range version will have to be developed. Defence scientists say the high-speed, two-stage Shaurya is highly manoeuvrable which also makes it less vulnerable to existing anti-missile defence systems.

Shaurya can reach a velocity of Mach 7.5 even at low altitudes. On 12 November 2008, the missile reached a velocity of Mach 5 as it crossed a distance of 300 km, with a surface temperature of 700° Celsius. The missile performed rolls to spread the heat uniformly on its surface. Flight time was between 500 seconds and 700 seconds. It has been described as a complex system with high-performance navigation and guidance systems, efficient propulsion systems, state-of-the-art control technologies and canisterised launch. It can be easily transported by road and launched by TEL. The missile, encased in a canister, is mounted on a single vehicle, which has only a driver's cabin, and the vehicle itself is the launch platform. This "single vehicle solution" reduces its signature – it cannot be easily detected by satellites – and makes its deployment easy. The gas generator, located at the bottom of the canister, fires for about a second and a half. It produces high pressure gas, which expands and ejects the missile from the tube. The missile has six motors; the first one is the motor in the gas generator. The centrepiece of a host of new technologies incorporated in Shaurya is its ring laser gyroscope and accelerometer. The ring laser gyroscope was tested and integrated by the Research Centre Imarat (RCI) based in Hyderabad.

The Shaurya missile was revealed to be designed specifically to be fired from submarines. A top DRDO scientist has confirmed this and further said that after taking off and reaching a height of about 50 km, the missile starts flying like a hypersonic cruise missile. Once it reaches the target area it manoeuvres towards the target before striking with an accuracy of 20 to 30 m within the target area.

Testing 
The missile was launched from an underground facility with an in-built canister from Complex-3 of the Integrated Test Range at Chandipur.

The missile was successfully test-fired for the third time, from the Integrated Test Range at Chandipur, Odisha, on Saturday 24 September 2011, in its final configuration. The missile flew at 7.5 Mach, and covered its full range of 700 km in 500 seconds. After this test, the missile is ready for production and induction into the Navy.

On 3 October 2020, DRDO successfully test-fired an advanced version of the Shaurya from Balasore as part of user trials. The Shaurya missile can strike targets at a range of around 800 kilometres that will complement the existing class of missile systems. The advance version of Shaurya is light weight and reaches hypersonic speed during the last phase of moving close to the target to render missile defense and countermeasure systems useless.

Operators
  - As of 6 October 2020, the Union Government of India under the guidance of National Security Council (NSC) approved induction and deployment of Shaurya in Strategic Forces Command (SFC).

Gallery

See also 
 Hypersonic Technology Vehicle 2 and Advanced Hypersonic Weapon – a similar US test vehicle and warhead
 Yu-71 – a similar Russian test vehicle (warhead)
 Hypersonic Technology Demonstrator Vehicle - an Indian hypersonic vehicle under development
 U.S. DARPA Falcon Project - Prompt Global Strike - Advanced Hypersonic Weapon
 HGV-202F - an Indian Hypersonic Glide Vehicle
 Rockwell X-30
 Boeing X-51
 Prompt Global Strike
 BrahMos
 BrahMos-II

References

External links 
 CSIS Missile Threat - Shaurya/Sagarika
 Shourya/Sagarika Missile

Surface-to-surface missiles
Nuclear missiles of India
Military equipment introduced in the 2010s